Dominator is the thirteenth studio album by the American heavy metal band W.A.S.P., it was released in 2007. The U.S. release was originally planned but the label deal fell through. Covers of "Burn" by Deep Purple and "Fortunate Son"  by Creedence Clearwater Revival were included on the originally announced track listing, but were dropped from the album's final cut. Dominator is based on the current American foreign policies.

Track listing

Personnel 
W.A.S.P.
Blackie Lawless - vocals, rhythm guitar, keyboards, producer
Doug Blair - lead guitar
Mike Duda - bass
Mike Dupke - drums
Darrell Roberts - lead guitar on "Deal with the Devil"

Production
Marc Moreau - engineer (except track 4)
Logan Mader - mixing (except track 4), mastering
Peter De Wint - engineer and mixing on track 4

Charts

References

W.A.S.P. albums
2007 albums
Albums produced by Blackie Lawless